Rapta FC is a South Sudanese football club located in Juba, South Sudan which currently plays in the South Sudan Football Championship.

Stadium
Currently the team plays at the 12,000 capacity Juba Stadium.

References

Football clubs in South Sudan